The Airkraft Sunny is an ultralight aircraft that was designed by Dieter Schulz. The aircraft was initially produced by his company, Tandem Aircraft KG of Saulgau, Germany, which built about 150 examples between 1989 and 1999. After he sold the rights in 1999, it was then produced by Dewald Leichtflugzeugbau Gmbh of Bad Schönborn, Germany and more recently by Airkraft Gmbh Leichtflugzeugbau of Beringen, Switzerland, who seem to have gone out of business in about 2010 and production ended. Originally supplied ready-to-fly, later the aircraft was supplied as a kit for amateur construction or as a complete ready-to-fly-aircraft.

Design and development
The aircraft complies with the Fédération Aéronautique Internationale microlight category rules. It features an unusual diamond-shaped biplane, strut-braced closed wing layout, a two-seats-in-tandem enclosed or open cockpit, fixed tricycle landing gear and a single engine in pusher configuration. The upper wing is swept back, while the lower wing is straight, but mounted further aft. The two wings are joined by swept tip rudders. The elevons are mounted to the lower wing only.

The aircraft is made from bolted-together aluminum tubing, with its flying surfaces covered in Dacron sailcloth.

Variants

Sunny Light
Version with open cockpit
Sunny Sport
Two seat tandem version with enclosed or semi-enclosed cockpit
Sunny Side-By-Side
Version with side-by-side configuration seats
Sunny Targa
Fully enclosed version.
Sunny Amphibian
Version with amphibious floats

Specifications (Sunny Light)

References

External links

Official website archive on Archive.org

1980s German ultralight aircraft
1980s Swiss ultralight aircraft
Homebuilt aircraft
Single-engined pusher aircraft
Closed wing aircraft